The Province of Manitoba, similar to other Canadian provinces and territories, is governed through a Westminster-based parliamentary system. The Manitoba government's authority to conduct provincial affairs is derived from the Constitution of Canada, which divides legislative powers among the federal parliament and the provincial legislatures. Manitoba operates through three levels of government: the executive, the legislative, and the judiciary. The executive branch—the Executive Council of Manitoba—consists of the Premier, who is the head of government and the President of the Executive Council. The legislative branch—Manitoba Legislature—consists of the Speaker and elected members, who are served by the Clerk, the Officers of the Legislative Assembly, and the employees of the legislative service. The Legislative Assembly consists of the 57 members (MLAs) elected to represent the people of Manitoba.

The judicial arm consists of the Chief Justice and the judges who preside over the courts. These three branches are linked through the Crown, which is the head of state and represented by the Lieutenant Governor of Manitoba. Under section 23 of the 1870 Manitoba Act (which is part of the Constitution of Canada), both English and French are official languages of the legislature and courts of Manitoba.

Manitoba's primary political parties are the New Democratic Party (NDP) and the Progressive Conservative Party (PC). The current Premier of Manitoba is Heather Stefanson, who leads the PC Party with 35 seats. The last general election was held on September 10, 2019.

Manitoba is represented in federal politics by fourteen Members of Parliament and six Senators.

Arms of Government
The Government of Manitoba uses a Westminster-based parliamentary system and has three levels of government: the executive, the legislative, and the judiciary. 

These three branches are linked through the Crown, which is the head of state and represented by the Lieutenant Governor of Manitoba, who is appointed by the Governor General of Canada on advice of the Prime Minister.

Legislative 
In Canada, each provincial legislature is composed of the Lieutenant-Governor and the provincial legislative assembly. As such, Manitoba is governed by a unicameral legislature, the Legislative Assembly of Manitoba. The Legislative Assembly consists of the 57 members (MLAs) elected to represent the people of Manitoba.

The Lieutenant Governor of Manitoba, who is appointed by the Governor General of Canada on advice of the Prime Minister, represents the head of state, the Crown. The head of state is primarily a ceremonial role, although the Lieutenant Governor has the official responsibility of ensuring that Manitoba always has a duly constituted government, with the authority to summon, prorogue, and dissolve the legislature.

In 1869, after the control of Rupert's Land was passed from Great Britain to the Government of Canada, Manitoba was created as the first Canadian province carved out of the North-Western Territory. It was given upper and lower houses, attaining full-fledged rights and responsibilities of self-government. The Legislative Assembly of Manitoba was soon established on 14 July 1870, and would first meet on 15 March 1871 in Fort Garry (now Winnipeg). In 1876, Manitoba would abolish its upper house, the Legislative Council, thereby becoming a unicameral legislature. In 1980, the Office of the Chief Electoral Officer was established to serve as an independent office of the Legislative Assembly for the purpose of administering fair elections

Executive 
The executive branch (or cabinet) of Manitoba—the Executive Council—is formed by members who are appointed by the majority party in the Legislative Assembly. That party's leader is the Premier of Manitoba, and is both the head of government and the President of the Executive Council.

In addition to the Premier, the executive branch consists of government ministries and deputy ministers.

The Lieutenant Governor appoints and may dismiss the Premier and the members of their cabinets.

Judiciary 
Manitoba's judiciary consists of three courts: 

 the Provincial Court — This court is primarily a criminal court; 95% of criminal cases in Manitoba are heard in this court.
 the Court of Queen's Bench — This court is the highest trial court in Manitoba. It has four jurisdictions: family law (child and family services cases), civil law, criminal law (for indictable offences), and appeals for Provincial Court decisions.
 the Court of Appeal — This court hears appeals from both the Court of Queen's Bench and the Provincial Court; decisions of this court can only be appealed to the Supreme Court of Canada.

Official languages
Under section 23 of the 1870 Manitoba Act (which is part of the Constitution of Canada), both English and French are official languages of the legislature and courts of Manitoba.

With a provisional government set up by Métis leader Louis Riel in the Red River Colony—following the Red River Rebellion (or Resistance) against the federal Canadian government—Prime Minister John A. Macdonald decided to negotiate with Riel and his party. The provisional government drafted four successive lists of rights, the final version of which became the basis of federal legislation that created Manitoba: the Manitoba Act. In addition to demanding that Manitoba be admitted into Confederation as a province (rather than a territory), among other things, the final list also demanded that the lieutenant governor of the new province speak both French and English. Though Macdonald was reluctant, Manitoba entered Confederation as a province, and English and French-language rights were safeguarded in the new legislature and the courts. However, the right to education in either English or French was not protected by the Act.

In April 1890, the Manitoba Legislature ceased to publish bilingual legislation, as well as taking other courses of action in attempts to abolish the official status of French in the province. However, in Reference Re Manitoba Language Rights (1985), the Supreme Court of Canada ruled that Manitoba Act §23 still applied, and that legislation published only in English was invalid. (Unilingual legislation was declared valid for a temporary period to allow time for translation.)

Although French is an official language for the purposes of the legislature, legislation, and the courts, the Manitoba Act does not require it to be an official language for the purpose of the executive branch—except when performing legislative or judicial functions. The Government of Manitoba is therefore not completely bilingual. The Manitoba French Language Services Policy of 1999 was established with the intent to provide a comparable level of provincial government services in both official languages. According to the 2006 Census, 82.8% of Manitoba's population spoke only English, 3.2% spoke only French, 15.1% spoke both, and 0.9% spoke neither.

In 2010, the Government of Manitoba passed the Aboriginal Languages Recognition Act, giving official recognition to seven indigenous languages: Cree, Dakota, Dene, Inuktitut, Michif, Ojibway, and Oji-Cree.

Federal politics
Manitoba is represented in federal politics by fourteen Members of Parliament and six Senators. At its inception, the province was allotted only four seats in the federal Parliament, which at the time allowed strong representation for Manitoba considering its small population.

Federal elections are administered by Elections Canada.

Confederation 
Following the Red River Rebellion (or Resistance) against the federal Canadian government—with concern over Métis land rights, among other things—local people of the Red River Settlement (or Colony) demanded for a voice to create the terms under which the Colony would be incorporated into the newly-formed Canada. As such, a popularly-elected convention supported the creation of a provisional government. This government, considered illegal by the federal government in Ottawa, was led by Louis Riel, himself a Métis. With a provisional government in place, Prime Minister John A. Macdonald decided to negotiate with Riel and his people. Riel's government drafted four successive lists of rights, the final version of which became the basis of federal legislation that created the Province of Manitoba: the Manitoba Act, which became part of the Constitution of Canada. Among other things, the final list demanded that Manitoba be admitted into Confederation as a province (rather than a territory). Though met with reluctance from Macdonald, Manitoba indeed entered Confederation as a province.

(Cf. Manitoba's total area today: .) The small population and size of the province made it unable to support itself financially. The federal government agreed to pay subsidies to the province, as well as grant it four seats in the federal Parliament.

Political parties

Historically, political parties first appeared between 1878 and 1883, with a two-party system: Liberals and Conservative. 

The United Farmers of Manitoba appeared in 1922, and later merged with the Liberals in 1932 to form the dominant political party. Other parties, including the Co-operative Commonwealth Federation (CCF), appeared during the Great Depression.

In the 1950s, Manitoban politics became a three-party system, and the Liberal party gradually declined in power. The CCF became the New Democratic Party (NDP), which came to power in 1969. Since then, the Conservatives, now the Progressive Conservative Party (PC), and the NDP have been the dominant parties.

Provincial elections 

In Manitoba, general elections to the Legislative Assembly are typically held every five years; however, the Lieutenant Governor is able to call one at any time. The last general election of Manitoba was held on 10 September 2019, three years after the one held on 19 April 2016.

These provincial elections are regulated by Elections Manitoba. Much like federal elections, Manitoba elections are administered by the province's Chief Electoral Officer (CEO), who is appointed by the Lieutenant Governor-in-council. The Office of the Chief Electoral Officer was established in 1980 to serve as an independent office of the Legislative Assembly and the Clerk of Executive Council. Obstructing the CEO would become an election offence as of 1998. Moreover, the CEO appoints the Commissioner of Elections, who carries sole investigation and prosecution responsibilities.

As of 2001, the CEO would also have the authority to appoint Returning Officers, which was originally a political appointment by Cabinet. Prior to 2001, in the case of a tie vote, the Returning Officer would be the one to cast the deciding ballot. Tie votes are now resolved through a by-election.

History of electoral system 

In 1870, only males who were established members of the community and in good financial standing, could vote. At that time, voting took place at public constituency meetings, in which each voter would publicly declare his preference. There, the electoral officer would record the votes, and the simple plurality (i.e., first-past-the-post or FPTP) system was used to elect members for the 24 seats in the Legislative Assembly. In 1888, the requirement to be in "good financial standing" was eliminated, and two years later, those receiving government salary of CA$350 or more could now vote.

In 1916, Manitoba would become the first Canadian province to grant women the right to vote.

A new system of representation would not be introduced until 1917, when Winnipeg was divided into 3 constituencies, each represented by 2 members. Voters in each constituency were issued two ballots, one for each seat, and neither candidate could be listed on both ballots. The rural constituencies, meanwhile, retained the plain FPTP system. 

Winnipeg was again the center of innovation for Manitoba's electoral system with the introduction of Single transferable vote, a proportional representation voting system, in 1920. This was the first time a PR system was used in a provincial election in Canada.  In this system, the city was consolidated into a single constituency electing 10 members; and voters cast one vote. Preferential votes were used to allow voters to mark back-up preferences. Voters had the right to indicate their preferences by numbering the candidates' names on the ballot paper (i.e., 1, 2, 3, etc.). The votes was counted using a method of counting provided via amendments to The Elections Act. 

In 1924, the FPTP system in districts outside Winnipeg was replaced by alternative voting, where to be elected a candidate had to have a majority of the votes. In constituencies with more than 2 nominated candidates, voters cast transferable votes by ranking the candidates, by ranking candidates by marking the ballot 1, 2, 3, etc. The mixed STV/FPTP and STV/AV systems were used in nine elections, until 1955.

Advance voting was first introduced during the 1932 general election of Manitoba.

In 1949, the single, 10-member constituency of Winnipeg was replaced by 3 constituencies, each represented by 4 members. Moreover, the constituency of St. Boniface was given 2 members. 

Six years later, Manitoba dropped the STV/AV system and divided all the multi-member districts into single-seat districts and switched to First past the post. Winnipeg. St. Boniface and two suburban districts was made into 20 single-member constituencies. FPTP was accepted at this time as the favourable system in both rural and urban constituencies.

Manitoba was the first province in Canada with an independent boundaries commission in 1957, when the Electoral Divisions Boundaries Commission is formed. The Commission would include three members until 2006, when the number was increased to five and the presidents of Brandon University and University College of the North were added.

The voting age was lowered in 1969 from 21 to 18.

In 1980, the Elections Finances Act (EFA) was proclaimed in Manitoba, introducing spending limits on advertising for candidates and parties; a tax-credit system for contributions to registered political parties and candidates; and provisions for financial disclosure of contributions and expenses. Three years later, it would be decided that election day is always to take place on a Tuesday. In 1985, spending limits were expanded to include all expenses, rather than just advertising. Since then, definitions were clarified (e.g., the definition of election expense), exclusions were made (e.g., voluntarism from being an election expense), and provisions were added (e.g., making advance payments and assigning reimbursements) throughout the decades. Effective 1 July 1986, only Canadian citizens would be eligible to vote, which would exclude British subjects and landed immigrants.

In 1998, penalties for election offences were increased. Though spending limits for advertising were also eliminated that year, they would be reinstated in 2001. Five years later, in 2006, rewriting of the Elections Act would bring about significant changes to understanding Manitoba's electoral system. A set election date was established in 2008, with the first election set to take place on 4 October 2011, and subsequent elections to take place on the first Tuesday of October every four years. Also that year, election expense limits and election advertising expense limits for parties and candidates were increased; political parties were made entitled to public funding (called an 'annual allowance'), with a requirement of having to file a statement in order to receive that allowance; the ban on government advertising and publications was extended to 90 days prior to a set-date election; and thresholds were increased for fundraising-event ticket sales and on items sold for fundraising.

Seats won in past elections 

The current Premier of Manitoba is Heather Stefanson, who leads the Progressive Conservative Party (PC) with 36 seats. The New Democratic Party (NDP) holds 17 seats, and the Liberal Party with 3 seats; however, the Liberals do not have official party status in the Manitoba Legislature.

Before World War I

Farmers, Labour, CCF and Duff Roblin (1915–69)

Recent history (1969–present)

Administrative divisions

Below the provincial level of government, Manitoba is divided into municipalities of two types: urban and rural. A municipality in Manitoba is "a municipality that is continued or formed under" the Municipal Act, which was enacted in 1996. Municipalities that can be formed under this legislation include urban municipalities (cities, towns and villages) and rural municipalities. The Local Government Districts Act, enacted in 1987, allows the formation of local government districts as another municipality type. Of Manitoba's 137 municipalities, 37 of them are urban municipalities (10 cities, 25 towns and 2 villages), 98 are rural municipalities and 2 are local government districts. The Municipal Act and the Local Government Districts Act stipulate governance of these municipalities. Additional charters or acts are in place specifically for the cities of Brandon, Flin Flon, Portage la Prairie, Thompson and Winnipeg, the towns of Morris and Winnipeg Beach, and the rural municipalities of Kelsey, St. Andrews and Victoria Beach.

See also 

 List of Manitoba general elections
 Monarchy in Manitoba
List of Manitoba government departments and agencies
Elections Manitoba
 Politics of Canada
 Political culture of Canada
 Council of the Federation

References

Cited legislation

Further reading 

 Adams, Christopher. 2008. Politics in Manitoba: Parties, Leaders, and Voters. Winnipeg: University of Manitoba Press. .
 Thomas, Paul, and Curtis Brown, eds. 2010. Manitoba Politics and Government: Issues, Institutions, Traditions. Winnipeg: University of Manitoba Press. .

External links 

 "Three Levels of Government in Canada (English)." Elections Manitoba. 2020 October 19.